Egbo is a Nigerian dish popular among the South Western part especially the people from Ibadan. The food is made from dry corn which is cooked until soft.

Overview 
Also known as corn porridge, egbo is similar to oatmeal. When eaten with sauce, beans and vegetables it is known as ororo robo.

See also
 Nigerian cuisine

References 

African cuisine
Nigerian cuisine
Staple foods
Yoruba cuisine